Frank S. Scott (2 December 188328 September 1912) was a United States Army corporal who died during his second enlistment, aged 28, in an aircraft crash.  As the first enlisted American to die in an aircraft incident, Scott was memorialized multiple times.

Personal life
Frank S. Scott was born in Braddock, Pennsylvania on 2 December 1883.  He and his sister Clara were orphaned in 1889 when their parents died in the Johnstown Flood; they were thereafter raised by an aunt.

US Army
Scott enlisted in the United States Army at Fort Slocum on 2 March 1908, and served with the Field Artillery Branch.  In 1911, Private Scott was discharged at Fort Myer (with "excellent"-rated character) from "Battery D, 3rd Regiment, Field Artillery."  The very same month, he re-enlisted with "Company G, Signal Corps."

That July, then-Corporal Scott began suffering from a lengthy unknown illness.  Upon recovery, he was deemed unfit for his current duties and transferred to the Signal Corps' Aeronautical Division at College Park Flying Field in Maryland.  At his new assignment, Scott discovered a penchant for mechanical engineering and was re-tasked from his duties of releasing hot air balloons to becoming chief mechanic for one of the Wright Model B biplanes assigned to the Field.

Death
By 27 September, Second Lieutenant Lewis Rockwell had promised Scott an aircraft-ride on 28 September while testing for his aviator ratings.  An officer had asked to be Rockwell's passenger, but since Scott weighed less (having not fully recovered from his 1911 illness), he received the coveted seat; excited about the upcoming flight, Scott joked with a visiting Captain Bernard Rome that he was just 2LT Rockwell's "ballast".

The next day, Rockwell test-flew the plane alone to ensure proper functioning; after reaching  and assured that the aircraft was functioning properly, the lieutenant landed and picked up Scott. However, when attempting to land, the plane developed engine problems and began to dive; Rockwell stopped the plane's  engine within  of the ground, but could not stop the descent and crash. Scott was dead at the scene, and Rockwell died later at Walter Reed General Hospital, having never regained consciousness. More than 300 people watched the crash.

The plane in question had been rebuilt thrice and logged over one thousand flights; it was made of wood, wire, cloth, and glue.  The official incident investigation found that the plane's control wires were still intact after the crash.  Coupled with eyewitness accounts, the investigatory board determined that pilot error was the cause: Rockwell misjudged the plane's altitude upon descent and could not recover from the dive.

Legacy
Scott and Rockwell were buried in Arlington National Cemetery on 1 October 1912; Scott's grave is numbered 5331-5 in section 13.

On 20 July 1917, in accordance with the standard procedure of naming aviation fields for those servicemembers who died "during the 'experimental' era" of aviation, Scott Field was named for the first American enlisted man to die in an aircraft accident.  With Chief Master Sergeant of the Air Force Thomas N. Barnes as the guest of honor on 20 July 1976, a granite-and-bronze memorial was dedicated to Corporal Scott at the Air Force base named for him.  , Scott Air Force Base was the only United States Air Force base named for an enlisted person.

References

See also
 List of accidents and incidents involving military aircraft before 1925

1883 births
1912 deaths
accidental deaths in Maryland
aircraft mechanics
burials at Arlington National Cemetery
missing middle or first names
people from Braddock, Pennsylvania
United States Army non-commissioned officers
victims of aviation accidents or incidents in 1912
victims of aviation accidents or incidents in the United States